Tachina tahoensis is a species of fly in the genus Tachina of the family Tachinidae that can be found in British Columbia and US states such as Arizona and California.

References

Insects described in 1938
Diptera of North America
tahoensis